

Edward Hopper Birthplace and Boyhood Home, also known as the Edward Hopper House Art Center, is an art center and historic home located at 82 North Broadway, 3 1/2 blocks north of Main Street, Nyack in Rockland County, New York. It is a 2-story, side hall, mid-19th-century Greek Revival–style dwelling with a -story, Queen Anne–style addition.  It was the home of noted artist Edward Hopper (1882–1967) from the time of his birth until he moved to Manhattan in 1910.  He held title to the house until his death.

It was listed on the National Register of Historic Places in 2000.

Edward Hopper House Art Center
The house is now the Edward Hopper House Art Center, which features one gallery dedicated to Hopper's life and work, and other galleries for changing exhibits.  The center also offers workshops, lectures, jazz concerts, figure drawing and other classes.

See also
 Nyack, New York

References

External links
 Edward Hopper House Art Center

Houses on the National Register of Historic Places in New York (state)
Queen Anne architecture in New York (state)
Houses completed in 1882
Houses in Rockland County, New York
Arts centers in New York (state)
Tourist attractions in Rockland County, New York
Art museums and galleries in New York (state)
Birthplaces of individual people
National Register of Historic Places in Rockland County, New York
Birthplace and Boyhood Home